WTFN is an Australian production company based in Melbourne. Formed in 2001 by Daryl Talbot and Steve Oemcke, the company is known for producing numerous observational documentary, lifestyle and reality series across many television networks.

History 
WTFN was founded by Daryl Talbot and Steve Oemcke in 2001. Talbot, a former journalist for the Bendigo Advertiser, had worked in television for a number of years and produced Postcards for Nine, and Oemcke began at a Channel 8 newsroom in central Victoria, and found fame as a host of the Seven Network’s long-running game show Wheel Of Fortune.

The company's first production was a Network Ten observational series Bread, which followed people starting a business sponsored by Sensis. WTFN quickly gained prominence producing titles that included Coxy's Big Break, Bondi Vet, and The Living Room. Bondi Vet has gone on to be sold in over 100 countries.

In 2012, the company launched international distribution company Fred Media, which represents both WTFN's programs and those from other production houses. The company has signed a number of international content output deals, including a 2011 deal with US based Discovery Communications, a 2012 deal with South African Okhule Media, and a 2014 deal with Chinese broadcaster Tianjin TV. It opened a Los Angeles based office in 2012.

The company received attention in 2012 after the broadcast of McDonalds's Gets Grilled on Seven. The documentary was the recipient of allegations of bias due to it being funded by McDonald's, but WTFN and Seven defended the program, saying that the producers maintained full editorial control over the content.

In 2013, WTFN made a move into producing drama content after acquiring production company The Film Company and appointing its head, Richard Keddie, as WTFN's Director of Drama and Features. WTFN had its first foray into feature films in 2016 with the release of Oddball starring Shane Jacobson, and children's television drama series Larry the Wonderpup in 2018.

WTFN began a succession of Victorian based observational documentary series for Nine Network in 2018 with Paramedics, followed by Emergency which films at The Royal Melbourne Hospital, and Mega Zoo shot across Melbourne Zoo, Werribee Open Range Zoo, and Healesville Sanctuary. Other series the company has gone on to produce include MTV American franchise Teen Mom spin-off Teen Mom Australia, Sydney Harbour Force for Discovery, Code 1: Minute by Minute and Police Strike Force for Seven, and decluttering/renovation series Space Invaders for Nine.

The name WTFN derives from a conversation Talbot and Oemcke had when starting the business. When discussing how to raise funding for their first pilot, one of the pair suggested putting in the money themselves and the other responded with "why the fuck not?", a phrase which was condensed into WTFN.

Productions

Television 
 A Pub Too Far
 Ask the Doctor
 Australia Plays Broadway
 Beyond the Boundary
 Bollywood Star
 Bondi Vet
 Bread
 Code 1: Minute by Minute
 Coxy's Big Break
 Danger! Wild Animals
 Discover Downunder
 Don't Come Monday
 Dr. Lisa to the Rescue
 Dream Job
 Emergency
 Free Sh!t Men
 G'day Cirque du Soleil
 Go For Your Life
 Great Innovators: The Rise of Australian Wine
 Guide to the Good Life
 Holidays For Sale
 Jade's Quest: To the Ends of the Earth
 Just Go
 Keeping Up with the Joneses
 Larry the Wonderpup
 Lee Chan's World Food Tour
 Long Lost Family
 Lost & Found
 McDonald's Gets Grilled
 Meet the Menagerie
 Megafactories
 Mega Zoo
 Melbourne Woman
 Mercurio's Menu
 Miguel's Feasts
 Oddball: The Nature of a Movie
 On Display
 On Thin Ice – Jade's Polar Dream
 Operation Thailand
 Our Wild Weather
 Paramedics
 Police Strike Force
 Real Rangers
 Shopping for Love
 Space Invaders
 Sudden Impact
 Supercar Showdown
 Sydney Harbour Force
 Sydney Harbour Patrol
 Talk to the Animals
 Tattoo Tales
 Teen Mom Australia
 Test Drive
 The Great Water Challenge
 The Great Weekend
 The Living Room
 The Making Of…
 The People Speak
 The Renovation King
 The Ultimate Rider
 The Wild Life of Tim Faulkner
 Tony Robinson Down Under (a.k.a. Tony Robinson Explores Australia)
 Tony Robinson's London Games Unearthed
 Tony Robinson's Time Travels
 Tony Robinson's Time Walks
 Tony Robinson's Tour of Duty
 Travels with the Bondi Vet
 Trishna & Krishna: The Quest for Separate Lives
 Vet on the Hill
 We're Talking Animals
 Wilde About Golf
 Your Domain
 Your Very First Puppy

Film 
 Oddball

References

External links 
 Official site
Television production companies of Australia